The gens Carfulena was a plebeian family at Rome toward the end of the Republic.  The gens is best known from Decimus Carfulenus, who served under Caesar during the Alexandrine War; other members are known from inscriptions.

Members
 Decimus Carfulenus, who served under Caesar during the Alexandrine War in 47 B.C., was tribune of the plebs in 44, the year of Caesar's assassination, and subsequently perished in the Battle of Mutina, in 43.
 Publius Carfulenus, the former master of Publius Carfulenus Modestus.
 Publius Carfulenus P. l. Modestus, a freedman mentioned in an inscription at Aquileia.
 Publius Carfulenus Princeps l., a freedman mentioned in an inscription at Aquileia.

See also
 List of Roman gentes

Footnotes

Footnotes

Bibliography
 Aulus Hirtius, De Bello Alexandrino.
 Marcus Tullius Cicero, Epistulae ad Familiares, Philippicae.
 Appianus Alexandrinus (Appian), Bellum Civile (The Civil War).
 Dictionary of Greek and Roman Biography and Mythology, William Smith, ed., Little, Brown and Company, Boston (1849).
 René Cagnat et alii, L'Année épigraphique (The Year in Epigraphy, abbreviated “AE”), Presses Universitaires de France (1888–present).

Roman gentes